The following is a list of Teen Choice Award winners and nominees for Choice Summer TV Star: Female. The category was first introduced in 2009 with Selena Gomez being the inaugural winner.

Choice Summer TV Star: Female has been won by Lucy Hale the most times, with three wins and have received the most nominations, with four. 

In 2018, the award was introduced as Choice Summer TV Star with the nominees, Male and Females being in the same category.

The current winner as Choice Summer TV Star: Female is Millie Bobby Brown for Stranger Things (2019).

Winners and nominees

2000s

2010s

Multiple wins 
The following individuals received two or more Choice Summer TV Star: Female awards:

3 Wins

 Lucy Hale

2 Wins

 Ashley Benson

Multiple nominations 
The following individuals received two or more Choice Summer TV Star: Female nominations:

4 Nominations

 Lucy Hale

3 Nominations

 Cierra Ramirez
 Maia Mitchell
 Shailene Woodley
 Troian Bellisario

2 Nominations

 Ashley Benson
 Aisha Dee
 Anna Paquin
 Chelsea Kane
 Crystal Reed
 Emily Osment
 Hilary Duff
 Italia Ricci
 Shay Mitchell
 Shelley Hennig

References

Summer TV Star Female
TV Star Female